Joel Muñoz Martinez (born March 3, 1982) and Randy Ariel Ortiz Acevedo (born July 16, 1983), best known as Jowell & Randy, is a reggaeton duo from San Juan, Puerto Rico. They met in 2000 and began working as a duo a year later, reaching international success in 2007 as members of Casa de Leones alongside compatriot rappers J King & Maximan and Guelo Star. Jowell & Randy's first studio album as duo, Los Más Sueltos del Reggaetón, was released in December 2007 under Warner Music Group and White Lion Records, a record label founded by Elías de Leon, one of reggaeton's most respected producers. However, their most successful album was El Momento, released in May 2010 under Wisin & Yandel's WY Records. It achieved the duo's highest debut on Billboards Top Latin Albums chart, peaking at number 2 and charting for 12 weeks. Three years later, they released their third and yet last studio album, Sobredoxis, which debuted at number-one on Billboards Latin Rhythm Albums chart. After that, the duo went to underground reggaeton, supporting new acts and serving as executive producers to their respective albums. The duo also released four non-successful mixtapes between 2010 and 2016: Tengan Paciencia, Pre-Doxis, Under Doxis and La Alcaldía del Perreo. During their career, Jowell & Randy performed different music genres, including reggaeton, underground reggaeton, reggae, latin pop, dancehall, pop rock and tribal.

After their rise to international notoriety, the duo managed to perform in various European countries, including France, Germany, Italy, Netherlands, Spain and Switzerland. They became the first reggaeton acts to perform in Australia and Monaco, where they served as special guests by Prince Albert II and Princess Caroline in 2016. As duo, their most commercially successful single is 2010's "Loco", managing to appear on five Billboard Latin charts and receiving a Billboard Latin Music Award nomination as artists for the song's performance on the Tropical Airplay chart. Their most popular music video on YouTube is the 2013 remix version of "Hey Mister", with more than 75 million views. Their discography consists of four studio albums, five mixtapes, twenty-three singles and forty-three music videos.

Albums

Studio albums

Mixtapes 
2010: Tengan Paciencia
2012: Pre-Doxis
2013: El Imperio Nazza: Doxis Edition
2014: Under Doxis
2016: La Alcaldía del Perreo

Singles

As lead artists

Other charted songs

Featured charting singles

Music videos

Lead

Featured

Album appearances

Notes

References 

 

                 

Reggaeton discographies
Discographies of Puerto Rican artists